Eidbukta is a village in the municipality of Meløy in Nordland county, Norway. The village lies at the entrance to the Glomfjorden.

References

Meløy
Villages in Nordland
Populated places of Arctic Norway